is a passenger railway station located in the city of  Atsugi, Kanagawa Prefecture, Japan.  The station operated by the private railway operator Odakyu Electric Railway. Part of the station physically extends into neighboring Isehara city.

Lines
Aikō-Ishida Station is served by the Odakyu Odawara Line, and lies 48.5 rail kilometers from the line's terminal at Shinjuku Station.

Station layout
The station has two opposed side platforms, with the station building is constructed on a cantilever above the platforms and tracks.

Platforms

History
Aikō-Ishida Station was opened on April 1, 1927, on the Odakyu Odawara Line of the Odakyu Electric Railway with normal and 6-car limited express services. A limited number of Romancecar express trains began serving the station from 1987,  the same year that the new station building was completed.

The station was named after Aikō, Atsugi and adjacent Ishida, Isehara.

Station numbering was introduced in January 2014 with Aikō-Ishida being assigned station number OH35.

Passenger statistics
In fiscal 2019, the station was used by an average of 54,602 passengers daily.

The passenger figures for previous years are as shown below.

Surrounding area
Japan National Route 246
Nissan Motor Technical Center
 Odawara Atsugi Road (Japan National Route 271)
Kanagawa Prefectural Ishida High School
Kanagawa Prefectural Isehara School for the Disabled
 Amada Co

Bus connections
There is a bus to Shoin University which takes 15 minutes during off-peak traffic.

See also
List of railway stations in Japan

References

External links

Official home page.

Railway stations in Japan opened in 1927
Odakyu Odawara Line
Railway stations in Kanagawa Prefecture
Atsugi, Kanagawa